Garra imbarbatus is a species of cyprinid fish in the genus Garra from Vietnam.

References 

Fish described in 2001
Cyprinid fish of Asia
Fish of Vietnam
Garra